Benny Shalita (born 13 November 1934) is an Israeli former politician, who served as a member of the Knesset for Likud between 1981 and 1988, and as mayor of Menahemia from 1956 until 1992.

Biography
Born in Haifa during the Mandate era, Shalita attended an External high school, before studying political science at university.

In 1956, at the age of 22, he was elected mayor of Menahemia local council, becoming the country's youngest-ever council head. He became a member of the board of directors of the Local Government Association, a member of the Galilee Authority, and a member of the board of directors of the Development towns. He remained mayor of the council until 1992.

A member of the Liberal Party, he was elected to the Knesset on the Likud list (then an alliance of the Liberal Party, Herut and other right-wing factions) in 1981. During his first term he sat on the Economic Affairs Committee, the Foreign Affairs and Defense Committee and the Internal Affairs and Environment Committee. He was re-elected in 1984, after which he also joined the State Control Committee, the Education and Culture Committee, the Immigration and Absorption Committee and the Finance Committee. He lost his seat in the 1988 elections.

References

External links

1934 births
People from Haifa
Jews in Mandatory Palestine
Mayors of local councils in Israel
Living people
Likud politicians
Members of the 10th Knesset (1981–1984)
Members of the 11th Knesset (1984–1988)